Ligament of head of rib may refer to:

 Intra-articular ligament of head of rib
 Radiate ligament of head of rib